Secret Agent of Terra is a 1962 science fiction novel by British writer John Brunner. It is the first book of the Zarathustra Refugee Planets series; the other books are Castaways' World (1963) and The Repairmen of Cyclops (1965). Secret Agent of Terra was first published as Ace Double F-133, with The Rim of Space by A. Bertram Chandler.

Brunner later reworked the story for his 1969 novel The Avengers of Carrig.

Plot summary

Planet 14 was just a speck on a spacial stereo map, just a world inhabited by a group of barbaric refugees. But to Belfeor, it was instant cash. All he needed was an iron hand and a means to dig out its radioactive resources for export to his own world. To Maddalena it was a final exam: this would be her last chance to prove herself worthy of Corps Galactica membership. To Saikmar, it was a nation and a people stolen from him by cruel treachery. To Gus Langenschmidt, it was part of a job he had, watching the skies and helping men who were being enslaved. But how do you help people who don't know you exist and who must not be told?

Bibliography

References

External links

1962 British novels
1962 science fiction novels
British science fiction novels
Novels by John Brunner
Ace Books books